The Sintra tramway is a seasonal narrow gauge tourist tram line in Portugal.

History 
Besides passenger traffic, freight was carried, principally between Banzão and Sintra station.

The following year, the urban line was closed, leaving just the original line between Sintra station and Praia das Maçãs. Winter service had ended in 1953, and the line continued to run as a summer only service until 1974.

Following the Carnation Revolution of 1974, there was no service on the tramway until 1980. A summer service then resumed, albeit an irregular service over the short section between Praia das Maçãs and Banzão.

Following denationalisation of Portugal's provincial bus services in the 1990s, ownership of the line was taken over by Stagecoach Portugal, but the tram services—which operated only during the tourist season—was later handed over to the Municipality of Sintra, which re-extended the line over its long-abandoned formation from Ribeira to central Sintra.

Damage to the infrastructure occurred in late 2011 when a tree fell on the line and a  stretch of overhead copper cables was stolen, costing the council €150,000. The tramway was reopened for the 2012 season.

References

External links 

 Elétrico de Sintra from Câmara Municipal de Sintra 

Sintra
Heritage streetcar systems